The Steiner–Lehmus theorem, a theorem in elementary geometry, was formulated by C. L. Lehmus and subsequently proved by Jakob Steiner. It states:

 Every triangle with two angle bisectors of equal lengths is isosceles.

The theorem was first mentioned in 1840 in a letter by C. L. Lehmus to C. Sturm, in which he asked for a purely geometric proof. Sturm passed the request on to other mathematicians and Steiner was among the first to provide a solution. The theorem became a rather popular topic in elementary geometry ever since with a somewhat regular publication of articles on it.

Direct proofs
The Steiner–Lehmus theorem can be proved using elementary geometry by proving the contrapositive statement: if a triangle is not isosceles, then it does not have two angle bisectors of equal length.

There is some controversy over whether a "direct" proof is possible;
allegedly "direct" proofs have been published, but not everyone agrees that these proofs are "direct."
For example, there exist simple algebraic expressions for angle bisectors in terms of the sides of the triangle. Equating two of these expressions and algebraically manipulating the equation results in a product of two factors which equal 0, but only one of them (a − b) can equal 0 and the other must be positive. Thus a = b. But this may not be considered direct as one must first argue about why the other factor cannot be 0.
John Conway
has argued that there can be no "equality-chasing" proof because the theorem (stated algebraically) does not hold over an arbitrary field, or even when negative real numbers are allowed as parameters.
A precise definition of a "direct proof" inside both classical and intuitionistic logic has been provided by Victor Pambuccian,
who proved, without presenting the direct proofs, that direct proofs must exist in both the classical logic and the intuitionistic logic setting.

Notes

References & further reading 
John Horton Conway, Alex Ryba: The Steiner-Lehmus Angle Bisector Theorem. In: Mircea Pitici (Hrsg.): The Best Writing on Mathematics 2015. Princeton University Press, 2016, pp. 154–166
Alexander Ostermann, Gerhard Wanner: Geometry by Its History. Springer, 2012, pp. 224–225
David Beran: SSA and the Steiner-Lehmus Theorem. The Mathematics Teacher, Vol. 85, No. 5 (May 1992), pp. 381–383 (JSTOR)
C. F. Parry: A Variation on the Steiner-Lehmus Theme. The Mathematical Gazette, Vol. 62, No. 420 (June 1978), pp. 89–94 (JSTOR)
Mordechai Lewin: On the Steiner-Lehmus Theorem. Mathematics Magazine, Vol. 47, No. 2 (March 1974), pp. 87–89 (JSTOR)
S. Abu-Saymeh, M. Hajja, H. A. ShahAli:  Another Variation on the Steiner-Lehmus Theme. Forum Geometricorum 8, 2008, pp. 131–140
V. Pambuccian, H. Struve, R. Struve: The Steiner-Lehmus theorem and triangles with congruent medians are isosceles hold in weak geometries. Beitraege zur Algebra und Geometrie 57 (2016), no. 2, 483–497

External links

Paul Yiu: Euclidean Geometry Notes, Lectures Notes, Florida Atlantic University, pp. 16–17
Torsten Sillke: Steiner–Lehmus Theorem, extensive compilation of proofs on a website of the University of Bielefeld

Euclidean geometry
Theorems about special triangles